Fremont High School is a co-educational, public high school in Sunnyvale, California, United States.  Fremont is currently the only open public high school located in the city of Sunnyvale and is part of the Fremont Union High School District (FUHSD).

History
Fremont High School was originally named West Side Union High School, the first school opened in the West Side Union High School District. In 1923, it opened in rooms of the Sunnyvale Grammar School as the only high school in the Sunnyvale–Cupertino (West Valley) area, and then moved to a temporary building after purchase of the school site in 1923. The school building was designed in 1925 by noted California school architect W. H. Weeks, after the necessary bond referendum passed on the third attempt. On March 27, 1925, the Board of Trustees unanimously voted to change the name of the school and district to Fremont Union High School.

In 1942, during the Second World War, Fremont became a temporary recruitment training ground and around half of the class of 1942 joined the military.

In 1969, a late-night fire occurred in the bell tower of the main building; the 1970 freshman class went to Monta Vista High School in Cupertino while rebuilding was done.

On July 1, 1996, after much controversy, the Fremont Union School Board did away with the original Indian mascot, replacing it with the current Firebirds mascot.

Campus
Fremont High School is located at the intersection of Fremont Avenue and Sunnyvale–Saratoga Road. The Fremont Union High School District's offices are also located on the school campus.

The original buildings are built in a Spanish mission architectural style. Three classroom buildings that were added in the 1950s on the Fremont Avenue side were demolished and replaced with new instructional and administrative space also in mission style, creating a quadrangle.

Demographics
In the 2014-2015 school year, Fremont had a total enrollment of 1,964 students. Asian students comprised 20.7% of the school's student population while Filipino & Pacific Islander students made up 12.1%. Black students made up 3.1% of the population. Hispanic students were the largest group, representing 44% of the student population with White students the second largest at 26.9% of the student population. Also, there were a small number of American Indian & Alaska Native students, around 0.1% of the student population.

Additionally, 21.1% of the students are English language learners and 42.3% are socio-economically disadvantaged.

Extracurriculars

Fremont students participate in a wide range of extracurricular activities ranging from marching band and athletics to various cultural, community service, and general interest clubs like Octagon, Key Club, Culinary Club, LiNK (Liberty in North Korea), the Apple Club, KDT(Konnect Dance Troupe) a Kpop club, and The Movie Club.  The poetry slam team has won numerous awards at spoken word poetry competitions. Fremont High School DECA has a variety of outstanding achievements, having over 2000 hours of community service as a whole for the 09-10 school year (more than all other Fremont clubs combined) and having sent numerous competitors to represent at the international competitive level. Seventy-five percent of those representatives became finalists at those international competitions. The Fremont wrestling team was one of the highest ranking high school wrestling teams in the state, taking 3rd place as a team at California Interscholastic Federation championships in 2006. They had 3 state champions that year and 2 of them went on to compete internationally. They still are one of the top teams in the Central Coast Section. In 2003–2004 the Fremont varsity cheerleaders took 1st place in every regional competition in which they competed. They then went on to win two United Spirit Association National Championships in Anaheim. They won the title for Small Coed Show Cheer and Coed Partner Stunt.

Notable alumni
Notable alumni of Fremont High School include:
 Tully Banta-Cain — New England Patriots football player, 2003–10
 Carl Ekern — Los Angeles Rams football player 1976-1988
 Andrew Fire — professor at Stanford University and 2006 Nobel Prize co-winner in Medicine or Physiology
 Bill Green, former United States and  NCAA record holder in Track and Field, fifth in the hammer throw at the 1984 Summer Olympics
 Donna Hanover — newscaster, actress, ex-wife of Rudy Giuliani
 Teri Hatcher — Golden Globe-winning actress
 Garry Jestadt — MLB San Diego Padres infielder
 Imran Khan — Bollywood actor
 Steve Kloves — Oscar-nominated screenwriter
 Francie Larrieu-Smith — Olympic distance runner, five-time Olympian, member of National Track and Field Hall of Fame
 Brian MacLeod — recording artist and songwriter
 Irene Miracle — Golden Globe-winning actress
 Borislav Novachkov — two-time CIF state wrestling champion, NCAA wrestling Division I runner-up, 2016 wrestling Olympian
 Joe Prunty — NBA Milwaukee Bucks assistant coach
 Jason Simontacchi — Washington Nationals baseball player
 Troy Tulowitzki — Toronto Blue Jays shortstop
 Peter Ueberroth — Olympic organizer, 1984 Time Man of the Year, commissioner of Major League Baseball
 Bruce Wilhelm — World's Strongest Man and Olympian in weightlifting

References

External links

 Fremont High School website
 Fremont Union High School District website

Educational institutions established in 1923
Fremont Union High School District
High schools in Santa Clara County, California
W. H. Weeks buildings
Public high schools in California
Education in Sunnyvale, California
1923 establishments in California